The JLOS House Project, is a proposed three-component government office development project in Uganda's capital city of Kampala, to house the offices of the Justice, Law and Order Sector (JLOS). The three components of the project are:

 JLOS Towers, an  office complex to house the headquarters of more than a dozen law enforcement and social services government departmental offices.
 Uganda Police Headquarters, a modern building to house the headquarters of the Uganda Police Force.
 Renovation, refurbishment and enlargement of existing office buildings that house the Courts of Appeal and headquarters of the Judiciary, to also accommodate the Uganda Supreme Court.

Location
The coordinates of the JLOS Towers would be 0°20'28.0"N, 32°36'39.0"E (Latitude:0.341114; Longitude:32.610832).

The second component in the project, is the headquarters of the Uganda Police Force, to be constructed immediately south of the JLOS Towers, at 40-96 Katalima Road, Naguru.

The third component is the renovation, refurbishment and enlargement of existing office buildings that house the Courts of Appeal and headquarters of the Judiciary, to accommodate the Uganda Supreme Court, currently housed in a building on Upper Kololo Terrace on Kololo Hill. That location is in the centre of the city, bounded by Lumumba Avenue to the north, Buganda Road to the south, Square One to the west and Square Two to the east. The coordinates of this location are: 0°18'56.0"N, 32°34'46.0"E (Latitude:0.315556; Longitude:32.579438).

Overview
JLOS Towers is planned to house the following government departments, currently scattered in different locations across the city:

 The headquarters of the Uganda Ministry of Justice and Constitutional Affairs
 The Uganda High Court
 The Uganda Ministry of Internal Affairs
 Offices of Uganda Human Rights Commission
 Headquarters of Uganda Prison Services 
 Headquarters of Uganda Registration Services Bureau
 The Justice, Law and Order Sector Secretariat
 Offices of Uganda Law Reform Commission
 Headquarters and offices of The Directorate of Public Prosecution
 Offices of the Judicial Service Commission
 Uganda Ministry of Gender, Labor and Social Development
 Headquarters of Uganda Tax Appeals Tribunal
 Headquarters of the Centre for Arbitration and Dispute Resolution
 The Uganda Directorate of Citizenship and Immigration Control.

Construction
In August 2015, following open international bidding, a consortium led by TWED Property Development Limited of Uganda and G5 Property Development Limited of  South Africa was selected to design, develop, construct and manage the project in a public-private partnership (PPP) arrangement. The other members of the consortium include FBW Architects and ROKO Construction Company. Financing will be provided by Standard Bank of South Africa and Stanbic Bank Uganda. Construction was expected to commence in 2016.

In June 2021, the Daily Monitor reported that construction would start in the second half of calendar year 2021 and last 24 months. The contract price is quoted as USh213 billion (approx. US$60.2 million), at that time.

See also
 List of tallest buildings in Kampala
 Luzira Maximum Security Prison
 Kitalya Maximum Security Prison

References

External links
 Thirteen companies have expressed interest in construction of a multi-billion Justice, Law and Order Sector (JLOS) complex in Naguru, a Kampala suburb

Government buildings in Uganda
Nakawa Division
Buildings and structures in Kampala
Central Region, Uganda